is a Japanese electric and electronics equipment company.

History 
The company traces its origins to Furukawa Ichibei who founded Nikko Copper Works, a copper-smelting facility at Yokohama in 1884, which became part of Furukuwa Kogyo. A new company; Furukuwa Denki Kogyo, was formed in 1920, when it merged its copper business with its own Yokohoma Wire Manufacturing Company, which it had acquired in 1908. So, the new company was able to combine its businesses of mining, refining, and making copper products, like wire and cable. 

Furukawa was a Japanese businessman who founded one of the fifteen largest industrial conglomerates in Japan, called Furukawa zaibatsu, to which Furukawa Electric belongs to this day.

The company is listed on the Tokyo stock Exchange and is constituent of the Nikkei 225 stock index.

Furukawa Electric aids CERN's experiments on the search for the Higgs boson with its superconducting magnet wires. The company's products also include superconductivity cables.

As of July 2013 the company has 137 subsidiaries and affiliate companies across Japan, Europe, North and South America.

Business segments and products 
 Electronics and automotive systems
 Wire harnesses and electronic components for automobiles
 Components for electronic equipment
 Magnet wires
 Energy and industrial products
 Copper wire rods
 Industrial power cables
 Microcellular foam
 Semiconductor processing tapes
 Light metals
 Aluminum can stock
 Aluminum tank materials for LNG vessels
 Aluminum materials for semiconductor manufacturing equipment
 Processed aluminum
 Metals
 Copper foils
 Wrought copper products for electronics
 Copper tubes for air conditioning
 Superconducting wires
 Telecommunications
 Optical fibers and cables
 Laser diode modules
 Optical amplifiers
 Networking equipments

See also
OFS (Company)

References

External links

 
OFS-Optical Fiber Solution (subsidiary)
  Wiki collection of bibliographic works on Furukawa Electric

Electronics companies of Japan
Electrical equipment manufacturers
Wire and cable manufacturers
Manufacturing companies based in Tokyo
Companies listed on the Tokyo Stock Exchange
Electronics companies established in 1884
Japanese companies established in 1884
Japanese brands
Furukawa Group